Catalaodes is a genus of snout moths. It was described by Viette in 1953. It contains the species C. cyanifusalis (Marion, 1955) (= analamalis Viette, 1960), C. malgassicalis Viette, 1953 and C. stygialis G. Leraut, 2018 which are found in Madagascar.

References

Epipaschiinae
Monotypic moth genera
Moths of Madagascar
Pyralidae genera